Ernst Hofer (born 1 August 1971) is a retired  Austrian judoka.

Achievements

Awards
 Goldenen Verdienstmedaille of the Austrian Judo Federation

References

External links
 
 Ernst Hofer on webpage of his club 

1971 births
Living people
Austrian male judoka
Place of birth missing (living people)
20th-century Austrian people